It Came Upon the Midnight Clear is a 1984 American made-for-television Christmas drama film starring Mickey Rooney and Scott Grimes.

Plot
The film centers on Mike Halligan (Mickey Rooney), a retired cop, who suffers a fatal heart attack while putting up Christmas lights days before Christmas. While waiting in the queue before the gates of Heaven he makes a deal with an archangel to return to life on Earth for a few more days in order to fulfill a promise to take his grandson (Scott Grimes) to New York City for the Christmas holidays. In exchange, he has to find a wayward angel (William Griffis) and tries to restore the Christmas Spirit to New York City.

Cast
 Mickey Rooney as Mike Halligan
 Scott Grimes as Robbie Westin
 Barrie Youngfellow as Kate Westin
 George Gaynes as the Arch Angel
 Elisha Cook, Jr. as Mr. Bibbs
 Annie Potts as Cindy Mills
 Lloyd Nolan as Monsignor Donoghue
 Gary Bayer as Rick Westin 
 William Griffis as Wiley Boggs 
 Christina Pickles as Chris
 Hamilton Camp as Meek Angel
 Lurene Tuttle as Mrs. Hunt

See also
 List of Christmas films

References

External links
 

1984 television films
1984 films
1980s Christmas films
American television films
American Christmas films
Christmas television films
Films directed by Peter H. Hunt
Films scored by Arthur B. Rubinstein